King in Shadow is a 1957 Western German historical drama film directed by Harald Braun and starring O. W. Fischer, Odile Versois and Horst Buchholz. The film portrays the interaction of Johann Friedrich Struensee a Doctor treating the mentally ill Christian VII of Denmark, and his English consort Caroline Matilda.

It was shot at the Bavaria Studios in Munich and on location in Hesse and Copenhagen. The film's sets were designed by the art director Walter Haag.

Cast
O. W. Fischer as Friedrich Struensee
Odile Versois as Queen Mathilde
Horst Buchholz as King Christian
Fritz Tillmann as Count Rantzau
Elisabeth Flickenschildt as Queen Juliane
Ingeborg Schöner as Gertrud von Eyben
Günther Hadank as State Minister Count Bernstorff
Siegfried Lowitz as Chamberlain Guldberg
Wilfried Jan Heyn as Baron Enevold Brandt
Gerhard Ritter as  Dr. Berger
Peter Esser as Court Chaplain Münter
Helmuth Lohner as Count Holck

See also
The Love of a Queen (1923)
The Dictator (1935)
A Royal Affair (2012)

References

External links

1950s historical drama films
German historical drama films
West German films
Films directed by Harald Braun
Films shot at Bavaria Studios
Bavaria Film films
Adultery in films
Films shot in Denmark
Films set in Copenhagen
Films set in the 1770s
Cultural depictions of Christian VII of Denmark
Cultural depictions of Caroline Matilda of Great Britain
1950s German-language films
1950s German films